was a Japanese astronomer. He was a prolific discoverer of asteroids, observing at Nihondaira Observatory.

In 1978 he became the first amateur to discover a minor planet (2090 Mizuho) in over fifty years, which he named after his daughter, Mizuho. His pioneering feat led to an upsurge in such discoveries. In the ten years that followed, amateurs from Japan discovered 160 minor planets. Urata shared his observation data with peer astronomers in Japan on a periodical called "Tenkai" (the Heavens), as well as contributed to academic journals such as Advances in Space Research and participated in poster presentations at astronomical conferences.

Urata co-discovered the periodic comet 112P/Urata-Niijima in 1986. One of the most active amateur astronomers in Japan, he was also an editor of the Japanese Ephemerides of Minor Planets. The 1927-discovered asteroid 3722 Urata is named after him.

List of discovered minor planets

References 
 

1947 births
2012 deaths
Discoverers of asteroids
Discoverers of comets

20th-century Japanese astronomers